Anglo-Saxons were Germanic tribes that settled in Britain and founded England.

Anglo-Saxon may also refer to:

 Anglo-Saxon (anthropology) or Nordic race, a putative Caucasian sub-race
 Anglo-Saxon England, the history of Anglo-Saxons
 Anglo-Saxon model, modern macroeconomic term
 Anglo-Saxon world, modern societies based on or influenced by English customs
 Old English or Anglo-Saxon, the earliest historical form of the English language
 , one of several ships
 White Anglo-Saxon Protestant, an ethnicity in the U.S.
 CSS Anglo-Saxon, a Confederate warship

See also
 Anglo, a prefix
 Saxon (disambiguation)